Cola is a type of soft drink.

Cola may also refer to:

Places
 Columbia, South Carolina, nicknamed Cola Town

Arts and media
 "Cola" (Lana Del Rey song), 2012 song by Lana Del Rey
 "Cola" (CamelPhat and Elderbrook song), a 2017 song by CamelPhat and Elderbrook
 Cola (band), a Montreal post-punk band

Biology
 Cola (moth), a genus of moths of the family Erebidae
 Cola (plant), the genus of plants from which the kola nut is harvested
 The kola nut
 a tight cluster of buds, as in the colas of a female cannabis plant

Technology
 Collision On Launch Assessment, an assessment made on the launch of a payload to space that the launch vehicle or spacecraft might collide with other artificial satellites or space debris during the launch and initial deployment

Other uses
 Cola (name), a surname and given name
 the plural of Colon (rhetoric), a rhetorical figure, or of Colon (punctuation)
 Cathedral of Our Lady of the Angels, Roman Catholic cathedral in Los Angeles, California
 Cost-of-living adjustment, adjustment of salaries based on changes in a cost-of-living index
"Piano de cola", Spanish for "grand piano"
 COLA - acronym in common use in Australia for open sided shelter. Covered Outdoor Learning Area.

See also
 Coke (disambiguation)
 Kola (disambiguation)
 Koala